Sir Louis Vangeke, M.S.C.  (1904 – 1982) was a Papua New Guinean prelate of the Catholic Church who served as the bishop of the Diocese of Bereina in Papua New Guinea from 1976 to 1979. Prior to that he was the auxiliary bishop of the Archdiocese of Port Moresby, also in Papua New Guinea.  Vangeke was consecrated as a bishop on 3 December 1970 by Pope Paul VI at St Mary's Cathedral in Sydney, Australia. He was the first indigenous Papua New Guinean Roman Catholic bishop. Vangeke died in 1982, aged 78.

References 

1904 births
1982 deaths
Papua New Guinean knights
Papua New Guinean Knights Commander of the Order of the British Empire
Papua New Guinean Roman Catholic bishops
Roman Catholic bishops of Bereina